Elvis Džafić (born 19 December 1990) is a Slovenian professional football goalkeeper who plays for Ilirija 1911.

Besides Slovenia, he has also played in Bosnia and Herzegovina.

Club career

Early career
Džafić started off his career at hometown club Svoboda Ljubljana where he played for the youth team and later on for the seniors as well.

Olimpija Ljubljana
In 2010, Džafić signed with Slovenian PrvaLiga club Olimpija Ljubljana. He made 64 league appearances for Olimpija in the rowspan of four seasons, the most being in the 2011–12 season making 33 league appearances. He left Olimpija in 2014.

Triglav
After leaving Olimpija, Džafić signed with Triglav Kranj, who back then played in the Slovenian Second League. He won the 2016–17 Slovenian Second League with Triglav and gained promotion to the 2017–18 Slovenian PrvaLiga.

He made 80 league appearances for Triglav, being a first team regular for the whole time. He left Triglav in 2018.

Sarajevo
On 17 August 2018, Džafić signed a contract with Bosnian Premier League club Sarajevo. He made his official debut for Sarajevo on 19 September 2018 in a 1–0 away win in the first round of the 2018–19 Bosnian Cup against Velež Mostar.

In the 2018–19 season, Džafić won the double with Sarajevo after winning both the Bosnian Cup and the Premier League. He made his first league appearance for Sarajevo in a 2–1 away league win against Velež Mostar on 23 November 2019.

Džafić won his second league title with the club on 1 June 2020, though after the 2019–20 Bosnian Premier League season was ended abruptly due to the COVID-19 pandemic in Bosnia and Herzegovina and after which Sarajevo were by default crowned league champions for a second consecutive time.

On 17 June 2020, he extended his contract with Sarajevo until June 2021. Džafić left Sarajevo after his contract with the club expired in June 2021.

International career
Džafić made two appearances for the Slovenian under-21 team in 2012.

Personal life
Džafić's family is from Bosnia and Herzegovina. His father is from Bosanski Novi and his mother is from Ključ.

Career statistics

Club

Honours
Triglav Kranj
Slovenian Second League: 2016–17

Sarajevo
Bosnian Premier League: 2018–19, 2019–20 
Bosnian Cup: 2018–19, 2020–21

References

External links

Player profile at NZS 

1990 births
Living people
Footballers from Ljubljana
Slovenian footballers
Association football goalkeepers
Slovenia under-21 international footballers
Slovenian expatriate footballers
Expatriate footballers in Bosnia and Herzegovina
Slovenian expatriate sportspeople in Bosnia and Herzegovina
Slovenian PrvaLiga players
Slovenian Second League players
Premier League of Bosnia and Herzegovina players
NK Svoboda Ljubljana players
NK Olimpija Ljubljana (2005) players
NK Triglav Kranj players
FK Sarajevo players
Slovenian people of Bosniak descent